George Rapall Noyes may refer to:

 George R. Noyes (1798–1868), American theologian
 George Rapall Noyes (Slavic scholar) (1873–1952), professor at Berkeley, University of California